The 1985 season of the Paraguayan Primera División, the top category of Paraguayan football, was played by 10 teams. The national champions were Olimpia.

Results

First stage

Second stage

Third stage

Final Stage

External links
Paraguay 1985 season at RSSSF

Para
Paraguayan Primera División seasons
1